Denbigh High School may refer to:

Denbigh High School, Denbighshire in Denbigh, Wales
Denbigh High School, Luton in Bedfordshire, England
Denbigh High School (Jamaica) in Clarendon, Denbigh, Jamaica
Denbigh High School (Newport News, Virginia) in Newport News, Virginia, USA